Erich Hagen (11 December 1936 – 26 May 1978) was a German cyclist who competed at the 1956 and 1960 Summer Olympics. His sporting career began with SC Wissenschaft Leipzig. In 1956, he finished in 22nd place in the individual road race. His team won a bronze medal in the road race, but he did not score. In 1960, he won a silver medal in the 100 km team time trial and finished 21st in the road race.

In 1960, he won the multistage Peace Race. Nationally, he won three titles between 1956 and 1958.

After retiring from cycling he worked as a taxi driver and died in a road crash.

References

1936 births
1978 deaths
German male cyclists
German track cyclists
Olympic cyclists of the United Team of Germany
Cyclists at the 1956 Summer Olympics
Cyclists at the 1960 Summer Olympics
Olympic silver medalists for the United Team of Germany
Olympic medalists in cycling
Sportspeople from Leipzig
Medalists at the 1960 Summer Olympics
Road incident deaths in Germany
German taxi drivers
Cyclists from Saxony
20th-century German people